Leucomelas is a genus of moths of the family Erebidae. It contains only one species, Leucomelas juvenilis, which is found in Russia (south-eastern Siberia, Amur, Ussuri, Primorje), China and Korea.

The length of the forewings is about 17 mm.

References

External links
Natural History Museum Lepidoptera genus database

Euclidiini
Monotypic moth genera
Moths of Asia